The European Ladies Amateur Championship is an annual amateur golf tournament. It is organized by the European Golf Association and is one of the "elite" tournaments recognized by the World Amateur Golf Ranking.

The championship was first played in 1986 and was called the International European Ladies Amateur Championship until 2015. There have been 33 editions contested so far, with many past winners and medallists of this championship are now members of the professional ranks.

Format
The top 144 ladies golfers compete for the win in a format consisting of four rounds of stroke play, with a cut after the third round, out of which the lowest 60 ladies' scores, including ties, qualify for the final round.

Winners

Source:

References

External links
European Golf Association
List of winners

Amateur golf tournaments
Golf tournaments in Europe